Alekos Dedes (born 29 July 1972) is a retired Greek football midfielder.

References

1972 births
Living people
Greek footballers
Kalamata F.C. players
Olympiacos F.C. players
Paniliakos F.C. players
PAS Giannina F.C. players
Messiniakos F.C. players
Thrasyvoulos F.C. players
A.E. Sparta P.A.E. players
Super League Greece players
Association football midfielders
People from Messenia
Footballers from the Peloponnese